Martin Lewis may refer to:

Martin Lewis (artist) (1881–1962), Australian artist and printmaker
Martin Lewis (Australian actor) (born 1970)
Martin Lewis (basketball) (born 1975), American basketball player
Martin Lewis (cricketer) (born 1969), English cricketer
Martin Lewis (English actor) (1888–1970), actor in The Heirloom Mystery
Martin Lewis (financial journalist) (born 1972), English journalist, television presenter, author
Martin Lewis (humorist) (born 1952), US-based writer, radio/TV host, humorist, producer, marketing strategist

See also
Martin and Lewis, American comedy team (1946–1956)
Martin and Lewis (film), a 2002 TV film about the comedy team
The Martin Lewis Money Show, British documentary show that airs on ITV

Martyn Lewis (disambiguation)